IFPA may refer to:
 International Federation of Placenta Associations
 International Fighter Pilots Academy
 International Fitness Professionals Association
 International Footbag Players' Association
 Irish Family Planning Association